Vladan Alanović (born July 3, 1967) is a retired Croatian basketball player, who won the silver medal with the Croatian national basketball team at the 1992 Summer Olympics in Barcelona, Spain.

References
 databaseOlympics

1967 births
Living people
Basketball players at the 1992 Summer Olympics
Basketball players at the 1996 Summer Olympics
CB Murcia players
Croatian expatriate basketball people in Russia
Croatian expatriate basketball people in Spain
Croatian expatriate basketball people in Turkey
Croatian men's basketball players
KK Cibona players
KK Split players
KK Zagreb players
Liga ACB players
Medalists at the 1992 Summer Olympics
Olympic basketball players of Croatia
Olympic medalists in basketball
Olympic silver medalists for Croatia
PBC CSKA Moscow players
Point guards
Śląsk Wrocław basketball players
Tofaş S.K. players
Türk Telekom B.K. players
1994 FIBA World Championship players